, sometimes abbreviated as GA, is a semi-annual fashion and music event held at Yoyogi National Gymnasium 1st Gymnasium in Tokyo, Japan. It is one of the biggest fashion events in Japan, with approximately 30,000 people attending each time. It is organized by GirlsAward Inc. under the slogan "Shibuya to Asia, and the World" and sponsored by Ministry of Foreign Affairs, Tokyo Metropolitan Government and Fuji Television.  Usually, the Autumn/Winter(A/W) event is held in September to October, and the Spring/Summer(S/S) is held in March to May of each year.

History 

On September 9, 2009, the first event GirlsAward 2009 was held at Shibuya O-East. It featured models, gravure idols, and auditions associated with DAM Karaoke system. In 2010, from GirlsAward 2010, the location was moved to Yoyogi National Gymnasium. From January 25 to 27, 2012, a collaboration event was held with South Korean television MBC featuring the fashion show and K-pop music. In 2014, the first overseas event with A-Nation was held in Taiwan. On April 9, 2016, during GirlsAward 2016 S/S, Instagram's CEO Kevin Systrom appeared on the stage and made a selfie performance with Haruna Kojima, a member of AKB48.

Past venues

Notes

References

External links 
 

Fashion events in Japan
Japanese fashion
Japanese subcultures
Recurring events established in 2010
2010 establishments in Japan
Events in Tokyo
Annual events in Japan
Semiannual events